The CAFVD Sports Stadium is a stadium in Khadki in Pune. This stadium is in front of the Khadki Station on old Mumbai-Pune road (Part of NH 4). Local Association Football and Field Hockey matches are played here on this stadium.

Many events of the army like annual functions are celebrated here. It is also known as an army trading area for players. It is maintained every day. and is the second biggest playground in Pune.

References

Sports venues in Pune
Sport in Pune
Football venues in India
Field hockey venues in Maharashtra
Football venues in Pune
Football venues in Maharashtra
Year of establishment missing